Şenkaya  is a town and district of Erzurum Province in the Eastern Anatolia region of Turkey. The mayor is Görbil Özcan (AKP). The population is 2,803 (as of 2010).

Villages

 Akşar
 Aktaş
 Alıcık
 Aşağıbakraçlı
 Atyolu
 Aydoğdu, Şenkaya
 Balkaya, Şenkaya
 Bereketli, Şenkaya
 Beşpınarlar, Şenkaya
 Beykaynak, Şenkaya
 Çamlıalan, Şenkaya
 Çatalelma, Şenkaya
 Değirmenlidere, Şenkaya
 Deliktaş, Şenkaya
 Doğanköy, Şenkaya
 Dokuzelma, Şenkaya
 Dolunay, Şenkaya
 Dörtyol, Şenkaya
 Esence, Şenkaya
 Esenyurt, Şenkaya
 Evbakan, Şenkaya
 Gaziler, Şenkaya
 Gezenek, Şenkaya
 Göllet, Şenkaya
 Göreşken, Şenkaya
 Gözalan, Şenkaya
 Gözebaşı, Şenkaya
 Gülveren, Şenkaya
 Hoşköy, Şenkaya
 İçmesu, Şenkaya
 İğdeli, Şenkaya
 İkizpınar, Şenkaya
 İnceçay, Şenkaya
 Kayalısu, Şenkaya
 Kaynak, Şenkaya
 Kireçli, Şenkaya
 Köroğlu, Şenkaya
 Köşkköy, Şenkaya
 Kürkçü, Şenkaya
 Nişantaşı, Şenkaya
 Ormanlı, Şenkaya
 Oyuktaş, Şenkaya
 Özyurt, Şenkaya
 Penek, Şenkaya
 Sarıkayalar, Şenkaya
 Sarıyar, Şenkaya
 Sındıran, Şenkaya
 Söğütler, Şenkaya
 Susuz, Şenkaya
 Şenpınar, Şenkaya
 Tahtköy, Şenkaya
 Tazeköy, Şenkaya
 Teketaş, Şenkaya
 Timurkışla, Şenkaya
 Turnalı, Şenkaya
 Tütenocak, Şenkaya
 Uğurlu, Şenkaya
 Yanıkkaval, Şenkaya
 Yaymeşe, Şenkaya
 Yazılı, Şenkaya
 Yelkıran, Şenkaya
 Yeşildemet, Şenkaya
 Yeşilkaya, Şenkaya
 Yoğurtçular, Şenkaya
 Yukarıbakraçlı, Şenkaya
 Yünören, Şenkaya
 Yürekli, Şenkaya
 Zümrütköy, Şenkaya

References

Populated places in Erzurum Province
Districts of Erzurum Province
 
Kurdish settlements in Turkey